Alba Township is one of twenty-four townships in Henry County, Illinois, USA.  As of the 2010 census, its population was 220 and it contained 95 housing units.  Alba Township changed its name from Elba Township on April 13, 1857. The name may be derived from Elba, New York, the native home of a share of the early settlers.

Geography

Extinct towns
 Kedron at 
(These towns are listed as "historical" by the USGS.)

Adjacent townships
 Yorktown Township (north)
 Fairfield Township, Bureau County (northeast)
 Gold Township, Bureau County (east)
 Mineral Township, Bureau County (southeast)
 Annawan Township (south)
 Cornwall Township (southwest)
 Atkinson Township (west)
 Loraine Township (northwest)

Cemeteries
The township contains these three cemeteries: Goble, Maple Grove and Sacred Heart.

Major highways
  Interstate 80
  Illinois Route 78

Airports and landing strips
 Thompson Airport

Landmarks
 Hennepin Canal Parkway State Park (east half)

Demographics

School districts
 Annawan Community Unit School District 226

Political districts
 Illinois's 14th congressional district
 State House District 90
 State Senate District 45

References
 
 United States Census Bureau 2008 TIGER/Line Shapefiles
 United States National Atlas

External links
 City-Data.com
 Illinois State Archives
 Township Officials of Illinois

Townships in Henry County, Illinois
Townships in Illinois